Sylva is a rural locality (a settlement) and the administrative center of Sylvenskoye Rural Settlement, Permsky District, Perm Krai, Russia. The population was 8,324 as of 2010. There are 140 streets.

Geography 
Sylva is located 36 km east of Perm (the district's administrative centre) by road. Troitsa is the nearest rural locality.

References 

Rural localities in Permsky District